Fyre may refer to:

Arts, entertainment, and media
Fyre Festival, a fraudulent, widely criticized music concert on the Bahamian island of Great Exuma
Fyre Fraud, a 2019 Hulu documentary about the Fyre Festival
Fyre (film), a 2019 Netflix documentary film about the Fyre Festival
Fyre (novel), a fantasy novel in the Septimus Heap series by Angie Sage
Fyre (software), a digital tool for producing artwork

People
Fyre, or Teri Byrne (born 1972), a wrestling personality also known as Fyre
Young Fyre, or Tramaine Winfrey (born 1986), an American record producer

See also
Fire (disambiguation)
Fyr (disambiguation)
Frye Festival, an annual literary festival in Moncton, New Brunswick, Canada
On Fyre, 1984 album by the American garage rock band Lyres